Ana Poščić (born ) is a  female artistic gymnast. She represents her nation at international competitions. She participated at the 2015 European Games in Baku.  She also competed at European Championships, including at the 2014 European Women's Artistic Gymnastics Championships.

References

1998 births
Living people
Croatian female artistic gymnasts
Place of birth missing (living people)
Gymnasts at the 2015 European Games
European Games competitors for Croatia
21st-century Croatian women